Bonheur River Kame Provincial Park is an  provincial nature reserve in Ontario, Canada. It became a nature reserve in 1985 via provincial legislation, primarily to protect the kame it contains, which is an important earth science feature.

The undisturbed kame, essentially a cone-shaped hill, lies in forest cover typical of the southern portions of the Boreal Shield ecozone.

As a nature reserve, the only acceptable human activity in the park is the observation of wildlife and birds. Development is banned, as is tourism and even subsistence activities such as fishing and hunting.

References

External links

Provincial parks of Ontario
Kames
Parks in Kenora District
Nature reserves in Ontario
Protected areas established in 1985
1985 establishments in Ontario